The cinnamon flycatcher (Pyrrhomyias cinnamomeus) is a species of bird in the family Tyrannidae. It is the only member of the genus Pyrrhomyias.

It is found in Venezuela, Colombia, Ecuador, Peru, Bolivia and northwestern Argentina. Its natural habitat is subtropical or tropical moist montane forests.

References

cinnamon flycatcher
Birds of the Northern Andes
cinnamon flycatcher
Taxonomy articles created by Polbot